Giuseppe Paratore (31 May 1876 – 26 February 1967) was an Italian attorney and politician. He was President of the Italian Senate from 26 June 1952 to 24 March 1953. President Giovanni Gronchi appointed him senator for life on 9 November 1957.

References

Italian life senators
1876 births
1967 deaths